Pucara (possibly from Aymara and Quechua for fortress) is a mountain in the Chila mountain range in the Andes of Peru, about  high. It is situated in the Arequipa Region, Caylloma Province, on the border of the districts Caylloma, Lari and Tuti. Pucara lies north-east of the mountain Mismi and east of the mountain Chuaña.

References 

Mountains of Peru
Mountains of Arequipa Region